Piz Macun is a mountain in the Sesvenna Range of the Alps, located south of Lavin in the canton of Graubünden. It overlooks the plateau of Macun on its southern side.

References

External links
 Piz Macun on Hikr

Mountains of the Alps
Mountains of Switzerland
Mountains of Graubünden
Two-thousanders of Switzerland
Zernez